The county governor of Akershus county in Norway represented the central government administration in the county. In 1917, the county governorships in Akershus and Oslo were merged, creating the new county governor of Oslo and Akershus. The three county governorships of Østfold, Oslo and Akershus, and Buskerud were merged on 1 January 2019.

Valgerd Svarstad Haugland was the last county governor of Oslo and Akershus. She started in office on 1 December 2011 and continued as county governor of Oslo og Viken from 1 January 2019.

References

Akershus
Akershus County Municipality